Toelgyfaloca albogrisea is a moth in the family Drepanidae. It was described by Rudolf Mell in 1942. It is found in the Chinese provinces of Jiangxi, Hunan, Fujian, Guangdong and Sichuan.

References

Moths described in 1942
Thyatirinae